Soharn Randy Boyagoda (born 1976) is a Canadian writer, intellectual and critic known for his novels Governor of the Northern Province (2006), Beggar's Feast (2011), Original Prin (2018), and Dante's Indiana (2021). He is also the author of a biography of Richard John Neuhaus (2015). He is the past principal and vice-president of the University of St. Michael's College in Toronto, where he held the Basilian Chair in Christianity, Arts and Letters. He is currently the Vice-Dean, Undergraduate, of the Faculty of Arts and Science at the University of Toronto. Boyagoda is also a professor in the University of Toronto's English Department, and currently chairs the PEN Canada Advisory Board. He served as President of PEN Canada from 2015-2017.

Biography 
Born in Oshawa, Ontario, in 1976 to Sri Lankan Catholic parents, Boyagoda earned his bachelor of arts in English at the University of Toronto (1999), and received his master's (2001) and doctorate (2005) in English from Boston University. In 2005, Boyagoda was a Postdoctoral Fellow with the Erasmus Institute at the University of Notre Dame, where he was Concurrent Assistant Professor of English. In 2006, he accepted a position as Assistant Professor of American Studies in the English Department at Ryerson University (now Toronto Metropolitan University). That same year, he published his first novel, Governor of the Northern Province. Boyagoda received early tenure in 2009, following the publication of his book Race, Immigration, and American Identity in the Fiction of Salman Rushdie, Ralph Ellison, and William Faulkner (2008). During his ten years at Ryerson, Boyagoda held a series of administrative positions, including Chair of the English Department and the founding Director of Zone Learning, a university-wide experiential learning program. In 2011, Boyagoda published his second novel, Beggar’s Feast, followed by a biography of Fr. Richard John Neuhaus in 2015. From 2015 to 2017, Boyagoda served as the President of PEN Canada. In 2016, Boyagoda became the principal and vice-president of the University of St. Michael's College and was appointed to the Basilian Chair in Christianity Arts and Letters. He also became a faculty member of the University of Toronto's English department. As a professor, Boyagoda teaches courses on the politics of the American novel and literary non-fiction, he also teaches the Gilson Seminar in Faith and Ideas, an exclusive seminar for students in their first-year of studies at the University of Toronto. Boyagoda’s third novel, Original Prin, was published in 2018. Boyagoda is now researching the relationship between transnationalism and nationalism in the creation of the "Great American Novel,” in addition to working on a sequel to Original Prin, titled Dante’s Indiana, anticipated September 2021. Boyagoda is a chair on Scotiabank Giller Prize Jury. Boyagoda lives in Toronto’s East End with his wife and four daughters.

Work 
Boyagoda's first novel, Governor of the Northern Province, was a finalist for the Scotiabank Giller Prize and published to national acclaim. The deeply satirical novel told the tale of Sam Bokarie, an ex–African warlord who moves to small-town Canada to capitalize on its zealous hospitality. Books in Canada commented, "In his take-no-prisoners novel about politics, immigration, and rock-solid Canadian naiveté, Randy Boyagoda emerges as the Evelyn Waugh of the North." It was described by the National Post as an "auspicious debut."

His second book, a monograph based on his doctoral dissertation, was published in 2008. In this book, he argues that the work of Salman Rushdie, Ralph Ellison, and William Faulkner reveals a century-long transformation of how American identity and experience have been imagined, and that these transformations have been provoked by new forms of immigration and by unanticipated mixings of cultures and ethnic groups. His scholarly work (on such authors as Herman Melville, Don DeLillo, and Flannery O'Connor) has also appeared in journals including the Southern Literary Journal, Studies in American Culture, and South Asian Review.

Boyagoda's second novel, Beggar's Feast,  has been published around the world to critical acclaim, by Penguin Canada in 2011, Perera-Hussain (Sri Lanka) and Penguin US in 2012, Harper-Collins India in 2013, and Penguin UK in 2014. Told in four parts, the novel traces the story of Sam Kandy, who is born to low prospects in a Ceylon village in 1899 and dies a hundred years later as the wealthy headman of the same village—a self-made shipping magnate and the father of 16 who's been married three times and widowed twice. Praised by The Globe and Mail as "a post-colonial Gatsby", Sam Kandy is the center of a novel about family, pride, and ambition. Shelagh Rogers of CBC Radio called the novel "swashbuckling", while the National Post described Boyagoda's narrative voice as being "as lush as the tropical landscape of Ceylon" and the New York Times described it as "a gleaming novel that tells the tale of a Ceylonese Odysseus." Beggar's Feast was nominated for the 2012 International Dublin Literary Award. and named a 2012 New York Times Book Review Editor's Choice selection.

In  2015, Boyagoda published a biography of Richard John Neuhaus, a project supported by the Social Sciences and Humanities Research Council of Canada. Neuhaus (1936-2009) was the prolific and influential Catholic priest and New York intellectual whose lifelong effort was to argue for the place of religion in American public life, something he did as a radical Leftist and Lutheran minister and as a  Catholic priest. Boyagoda's biography, entitled Richard John Neuhaus: A Life in the Public Square, has met with wide critical attention, with notable reviews running in the New York Times, Wall Street Journal, and Globe and Mail.

Boyagoda’s third novel, Original Prin, was published by Biblioasis in Canada in 2018 and in the United States in 2019. The novel, the first of a projected trilogy, tells the story of Prin, a forty-year-old professor at a Catholic college in downtown Toronto. After surviving cancer, Prin commits to becoming a better husband and father. His pursuit of this goal is interrupted by the imminent shutdown of his college and the arrival of Prin’s ex-girlfriend from graduate school, Wende, who is now working as a consultant to the college. Divinely inspired, Prin agrees to travel to the Middle East with Wende to launch an academic partnership that has deadly consequences. The Toronto Star called the novel “fresh and utterly original.” The sequel, Dante’s Indiana, was published in 2021.

As a literary and cultural commentator, Boyagoda is a frequent contributor to magazines and newspapers including the Financial Times, Chronicle of Higher Education, the Paris Review, Harper's Magazine, the Wall Street Journal, First Things, the Walrus, the New York Times, the National Post, and The Globe and Mail, the New Statesman and The Guardian. His criticism includes reviews of Enid Blyton, Haruki Murakami, Orhan Pamuk, Gabriel Garcia Marquez, and Jose Saramago, among others.

Bibliography 
 Governor of the Northern Province: A Novel (2006) 
 Race, Immigration and American Identity in the Fiction of Salman Rushdie, Ralph Ellison, and William Faulkner (2008) 
 Beggar's Feast: A Novel (2011-2014) 
 Richard John Neuhaus: A Life in the Public Square (2015) 
Original Prin (2018) 
Dante's Indiana (2021)

References

External links
 Office of the Principal - University of St. Michael's College:Link
 University of Toronto English Department Profile:Link
 PEN Canada Profile:Link

1976 births
Canadian male novelists
Canadian people of Sri Lankan descent
People from Oshawa
Writers from Ontario
Academic staff of Toronto Metropolitan University
Canadian writers of Asian descent
Living people
Academic staff of the University of Toronto
21st-century Canadian novelists
21st-century Canadian male writers
Canadian male non-fiction writers
21st-century Canadian non-fiction writers